"I Don't Mind" is a song by American vocalist and guitarist Lindsey Buckingham from the eponymous seventh solo studio album Lindsey Buckingham. It was released on June 8, 2021, as the lead single from the album, which was announced simultaneously.

Background
"I Don't Mind" is Buckingham's first single release since "The End of Time" from the album Seeds We Sow, released in 2011. It is also his first single released following his departure from the British American rock band Fleetwood Mac in 2018.

According to Buckingham the song is about "the challenges couples face in long-term relationships. Over time, two people inevitably find the need to augment their initial dynamic with one of flexibility, an acceptance of each others' flaws, and a willingness to continually work on issues; it is the essence of a good long-term relationship. This song celebrates that spirit and discipline."

Release

References

2021 singles
2021 songs
Lindsey Buckingham songs
Songs written by Lindsey Buckingham